Cindy-Lee E. Dennis  is a Canadian professor in the Lawrence S. Bloomberg Faculty of Nursing and the Faculty of Medicine, Department of Psychiatry at the University of Toronto. She holds the Women's Health Research Chair at Li Ka Shing Knowledge Institute, St. Michael's Hospital. Previously she held the Canada Research Chair in Perinatal Community Health at the University of Toronto.

Early life and education
Dennis completed her Bachelor of Science in Nursing at the University of Toronto (U of T) in 1991 before enrolling at the University of Western Ontario for her Master's degree. Upon graduating in 1995, Dennis returned to U of T for her PhD before joining the University of British Columbia for her postdoctoral fellowship.

Career
Following her PhD and postdoctoral fellowship, Dennis joined the faculty at the University of Toronto in 2002 where she has focused her research career on rigorously evaluating interventions that can directly improve the health of mothers and fathers, with the overall goal of improving child health and well-being. She has over 25 years of experience leading large cohort studies and clinical trials — including intervention care models that leverage technology to improve clinical effectiveness and accessibility —  recruiting participants from all across Canada. She also developed the Breastfeeding Self-Efficacy Scale, the most widely used breastfeeding measure internationally that has been translated into over 20 different languages to identify women early who are at-risk of poor breastfeeding outcomes. In 2003 she was awarded by the Ontario Ministry of Health and Long-term Care a Career Scientist Award and in 2005 she was awarded a Canadian Institutes of Health Research (CIHR) New Investigator Award. In 2007, she was appointed a Tier 2 Canada Research Chair in Perinatal Community Health. In 2011, she became the first nurse to receive Shirley Brown Chair in Women's Mental Health Research based at the Women's College Hospital's Research Institute.

As the Shirley Brown Chair, Dennis collaborated with Simone Vigod on studying depression in pregnancy and postpartum. She specifically focused on examining the impact of perinatal mental illness of both parents in the first two years of a child's life, to  develop effective technology-based preventive and treatment interventions. In 2013, Dennis was honoured by the Mood Disorders Association of Ontario with the Hope Inspiration Award. At the same time, Dennis received a CIHR Grant to evaluate the effectiveness of a breastfeeding self-efficacy enhancing intervention. She also led seven large, multi-site studies related to improving breastfeeding rates and coordinating perinatal mental illness identification and treatment. As a result of her overall research, Dennis was appointed the Women's Health Research Chair at U of T and St. Michael's Hospital.

In 2018, Dennis was elected a Fellow of the Canadian Academy of Health Sciences. She was also awarded the Marcé Medal by the International Marcé Society for her "continued achievements and commitment to research in the field of prenatal and postnatal mental health in women."

References

External links

Living people
People from St. Thomas, Ontario
Year of birth missing (living people)
Academic staff of the University of Toronto
University of Toronto alumni
University of Western Ontario alumni
Fellows of the Canadian Academy of Health Sciences
Canada Research Chairs